Belarus participated in the Eurovision Song Contest 2005 with the song "Love Me Tonight" written by Nikos Terzis and Nektarios Tyrakis. The song was performed by Angelica Agurbash. The Belarusian entry for the 2005 contest in Kyiv, Ukraine was selected through a national final organised by the Belarusian broadcaster National State Television and Radio Company of the Republic of Belarus (BTRC). The national final consisted of a semi-final which was a televised production and an untelevised final held on 25 December 2004 and 31 January 2005, respectively. Fifteen competing acts participated in the semi-final where the top three entries as determined by a public televote qualified to the final. In the final, "Boys and Girls" performed by Angelica Agurbash was initially selected as the winner by a jury panel, however the singer opted to withdraw her song and the replacement entry, "Love Me Tonight", was announced on 18 March 2005.

Belarus competed in the semi-final of the Eurovision Song Contest which took place on 19 May 2005. Performing during the show in position 8, "Love Me Tonight" was not announced among the top 10 entries of the semi-final and therefore did not qualify to compete in the final. It was later revealed that Belarus placed thirteenth out of the 25 participating countries in the semi-final with 67 points.

Background 

Prior to the 2005 Contest, Belarus had participated in the Eurovision Song Contest one time since its first entry in 2004. The nation's best placing in the contest was nineteenth in the semi-final, which it achieved in 2004 with the song "My Galileo" performed by Aleksandra and Konstantin.

The Belarusian national broadcaster, National State Television and Radio Company of the Republic of Belarus (BTRC), broadcasts the event within Belarus and organises the selection process for the nation's entry. In 2004, BTRC organised a national final in order to choose Belarus' entry, a selection procedure that continued for their 2005 entry.

Before Eurovision

National final 
The Belarusian national final consisted of a semi-final and final held on 25 December 2004 and 31 January 2005, respectively. The televised portion of the competition was broadcast on the First Channel.

Competing entries 
On 17 September 2004, BTRC opened the submission period for artists and composers to submit their applications and entries until 1 October 2004, however, the deadline was later postponed until 1 November 2004. At the closing of the deadline, 31 entries were received by the broadcaster. A jury panel was tasked with selecting up to fifteen entries to proceed to the televised national final. Thirteen semi-finalists were initially selected and announced on 17 December 2004, while the song "From Belarus With Love" performed by Janet was later announced as the fourteenth semi-finalist.

Semi-final 
The televised semi-final aired on 25 December 2004, hosted by Svetlana Borovskaya and Ales Kruglyakov. The show was filmed on 23 and 24 December 2004 at the BTRC studios in Minsk. Public televoting exclusively selected the top three songs to qualify to the final.

Final 
The untelevised final took place on 31 January 2005 at the Youth Variety Theater in Minsk. The votes of jury members made up of music professionals selected the song "Boys and Girls" performed by Angelica Agurbash as the winner.

Song selection 
Following Angelica Agurbash's win at the Belarusian national final, the singer stated that she could be performing a song other than "Boys and Girls" at the Eurovision Song Contest. The national final rules set by BTRC allowed for the winning artist to change their song if they were able to find a more suitable alternative for the contest. The broadcaster later announced that three songs were under consideration: a new version of "Boys and Girls" recorded at the Abbey Road Studios in London, "Love Me Tonight" written by Nikos Terzis and Nektarios Tyrakis, and "Show Me Your Love" written by Svika Pick and Mirit Shem-Or. A public poll was also opened on Agurbash's official website in order to provide consultation on which song should be selected.

On 18 March 2005, BTRC announced that Angelica Agurbash would be performing the song "Love Me Tonight" at the 2005 Eurovision Song Contest, which officially replaced "Boys and Girls" as the Belarusian entry through the decision of jury members made up of music professionals. The song was presented to the public via the release of the official music video on 22 March 2005.

At Eurovision
According to Eurovision rules, all nations with the exceptions of the host country, the "Big Four" (France, Germany, Spain and the United Kingdom) and the ten highest placed finishers in the 2004 contest were required to qualify from the semi-final in order to compete for the final; the top ten countries from the semi-final would progress to the final. A special allocation draw was held which determined the running order for the semi-final on 19 May 2005. Belarus was drawn to perform in position 8, following the entry from Israel and before the entry from Netherlands.

The two semi-finals and the final were broadcast in Belarus on the First Channel with commentary by Ales Kruglyakov. The Belarusian spokesperson, who announced the Belarusian votes during the final, was Elena Ponomareva.

Semi-final 
Angelica Agurbash took part in technical rehearsals on 12 and 14 May, followed by dress rehearsals on 18 and 19 May. Prior to the semi-final, Belarus was considered by bookmakers to be the fourth most likely country to advance into the final.

The Belarusian performance featured Angelica Agurbash performing a choreographed routine on stage wearing a golden outfit together with four male backing dancers wearing denim outfits with white collars which was based on the Tsarist court servants. Agurbash's outfit was removed twice during the performance, firstly revealing a blue and gold dress designed by Russian designer Valentin Yudashkin who based the design on the Ekaterina II collection, and secondly a golden skin-tight body suit containing Swarovski crystals. Agurbash was also joined by two on-stage backing vocalists: Chryso Stamatopoulou and Victoria Chalkitis.

At the end of the show, Belarus was not announced among the top 10 entries in the semi-final and therefore failed to qualify to compete in the final. It was later revealed that Belarus placed thirteenth in the semi-final, receiving a total of 67 points.

Voting 
Below is a breakdown of points awarded to Belarus and awarded by Belarus in the semi-final and grand final of the contest. The nation awarded its 12 points to Israel in the semi-final and to Russia in the final of the contest.

Points awarded to Belarus

Points awarded by Belarus

References

2005
Countries in the Eurovision Song Contest 2005
Eurovision